Lubianka is a village in Bucha Raion, Kyiv Oblast, Ukraine, situated to the north-west of the capital city Kyiv. It belongs to Bucha urban hromada, one of the hromadas of Ukraine. 

Until 18 July 2020, Lubianka belonged to Borodianka Raion. The raion was abolished that day as part of the administrative reform of Ukraine, which reduced the number of raions of Kyiv Oblast to seven. The area of Borodianka Raion was merged into Bucha Raion.

During the 2022 invasion of Ukraine, units dispersed from the Russian Kyiv convoy set up in Lubyanka and its nearby forests.

References

External links 
 

Villages in Bucha Raion